Arthur Shurlock (September 8, 1937 – May 14, 2022) was an American gymnast. He competed in eight events at the 1964 Summer Olympics.

Shurlock died on May 14, 2022, at the age of 84.

References

External links
 

1937 births
2022 deaths
American male artistic gymnasts
Olympic gymnasts of the United States
Gymnasts at the 1964 Summer Olympics
Sportspeople from Chicago
California Golden Bears men's gymnasts